Carolyn Parton (born 1964) is a South African artist living and working in Cape Town. 

Parton is particularly interested in the impact of artists and their art making on the environment. Many of her works are made using spent and discarded paint tubes from other artists, which are then recycled into new images. Parton's work addresses both the waste generated in traditional painting and the environmental impact of the paint itself. The weight of reclaimed paint used in a piece determines the piece's title.

Career
Enviroserv Waste Art winner (2008)
Spier Contemporary (2010)

Awards
 2010: Spier Contemporary finalist
 2008: Enviroserv Waste Art winner
 2006: University of South Africa Award for top Art student

Exhibitions
 2010: Spier Contemporary, Cape Town City Hall.
 2007: Solo exhibition, Release, X-Cape, Hippocampus, Cape Town.
 2004/2006: University of South Africa student group exhibitions, ArtB Gallery, Bellville.

References

Living people
1964 births
University of South Africa alumni
20th-century South African women artists
21st-century South African women artists
Artists from Cape Town